This is a glossary of algebraic geometry.

See also glossary of commutative algebra, glossary of classical algebraic geometry, and glossary of ring theory. For the number-theoretic applications, see glossary of arithmetic and Diophantine geometry.

For simplicity, a reference to the base scheme is often omitted; i.e., a scheme will be a scheme over some fixed base scheme S and a morphism an S-morphism.

!$@

A

B

C

D

E

F

G

H

I

J

K

L

M

N

O

P

Q

R

S

T

U

V

W

Z

Notes

References 

Kollár, János, "Book on Moduli of Surfaces" available at his website 
Martin's Olsson's course notes written by Anton, https://web.archive.org/web/20121108104319/http://math.berkeley.edu/~anton/written/Stacks/Stacks.pdf
A book worked out by many authors.

See also 
Glossary of arithmetic and Diophantine geometry
Glossary of classical algebraic geometry
Glossary of differential geometry and topology
Glossary of Riemannian and metric geometry
List of complex and algebraic surfaces
List of surfaces
List of curves

Algebraic geometry
Algebraic geometry
Scheme theory
Wikipedia glossaries using description lists